The orange-fronted plushcrown (Metopothrix aurantiaca) is a species of bird in the family Furnariidae. It is the only member of the genus Metopothrix.

It is found in Bolivia, Brazil, Colombia, Ecuador, and Peru. Its natural habitats are subtropical or tropical moist lowland forest and heavily degraded former forest.

Within the ovenbird family, the orange-fronted plushcrown is genetically most closely related to the greytails in the genus Metopothrix. The species is monotypic: no subspecies are recognised.

References

orange-fronted plushcrown
Birds of the Amazon Basin
Birds of the Ecuadorian Amazon
Birds of the Peruvian Amazon
orange-fronted plushcrown
orange-fronted plushcrown
orange-fronted plushcrown
Taxonomy articles created by Polbot